Velemseni Ndwandwe (born 18 January 1996) is a South African soccer player who plays as a midfielder for South African Premier Division side Lamontville Golden Arrows.

References

Living people
1996 births
South African soccer players
People from Empangeni
Soccer players from KwaZulu-Natal
Association football midfielders
Lamontville Golden Arrows F.C. players
South African Premier Division players